Deputy Glitters (foaled April 27, 2003 in Kentucky) is an American Thoroughbred racehorse who was a contender for the U.S. Triple Crown in 2006.

Connections
Deputy Glitters is owned and bred by Joseph LaCombe Stable Inc. and trained by Thomas Albertrani. He has been ridden by René R. Douglas and Jose Lezcano.

Races

References
 Deputy Glitters pedigree, with photo
 NTRA bio

Thoroughbred family 18-a
Racehorses trained in the United States
Racehorses bred in Kentucky
2003 racehorse births